The 42nd Edition Vuelta a España (Tour of Spain), a long-distance bicycle stage race and one of the 3 grand tours, was held from 23 April to 15 May 1987. It consisted of 22 stages covering a total of 3,921 km, and was won by Luis Herrera of the Café de Colombia cycling team. It was the first win of a Grand Tour by a Colombian and also the first of a South American.

With the 1986 Vuelta Champion, Álvaro Pino was absent due to health problems, the principal favourites for the overall classification were Laurent Fignon, Pedro Delgado and Sean Kelly. Jean Luc Vandenbroucke won the prologue and wore the first leader's jersey. Kelly who was in form after winning Paris–Nice for the sixth time won the first stage and took the jersey. The sixth stage saw the beginning of the fight for the overall classification. Luis Herrera in the company of Ángel Arroyo and Vicente Belda attacked several times on the final ascent of the stage. However Kelly was still able to ride into the leader's jersey again. On the following stage to Cerler which was won by the Spaniard Laudelino Cubino, Herrera put time into Kelly and Dietzen finished ahead of Kelly and took the leader's jersey. Herrera took the jersey after the 11th stage that finished on the Lagos de Covadonga. However Kelly retook the leader's jersey in the stage 18 time trial and with four stages to go it looked as if he was going to win his first grand tour. However Kelly was forced to withdraw from the race the following day due to a saddle boil. Fignon won the following stage and moved up to third place overall ahead of Delgado. Herrera took back the jersey which he kept to the end to win the race. It was the first win of a Grand Tour by a Colombian and also the first of a South American.

Teams and riders

Route

Classification leadership

Final classification standings

General classification

Points classification

Mountains classification

Young rider classification

Team classification

Sprint classification

Flying goal classification

References

 
1987 in road cycling
1987
1987 in Spanish sport
1987 Super Prestige Pernod International